is a trans-Neptunian object with a possible moon from the outer regions of the Solar System. It is approximately 940 kilometers across its longest axis, as it has an elongated shape. It belongs to the plutinos – a group of minor planets named after its largest member Pluto – as it orbits in a 2:3 resonance with Neptune in the Kuiper belt. It was discovered on 13 January 2003, by American astronomers Chad Trujillo and Michael Brown during the NEAT survey using the Samuel Oschin telescope at Palomar Observatory.

Though elongated in shape,  displays a small lightcurve amplitude due to its rotation axis being oriented nearly pole-on; the variability is mainly caused by albedo features on its surface.

It is considered a very likely dwarf planet by astronomers Gonzalo Tancredi and Michael Brown. However, Will M. Grundy et al. conclude that objects such as this, in the size range of 400–1,000 km, with albedos less than ≈0.2 and densities of ≈1.2 g/cm3 or less, have likely never compressed into fully solid bodies, let alone differentiated or collapsed into hydrostatic equilibrium, and so are highly unlikely to be dwarf planets.

Physical characteristics 

These results are in agreement with each other.
The large size of  makes it a possible dwarf planet. However, the low density that results from assuming it not to be in hydrostatic equilibrium suggests the opposite. Its mass is unknown since the satellite has not been recovered.

But this is only a lower limit for the diameter of  because the chord may not have passed through the center of the body.

In 2017, stellar occultations and data from its rotational lightcurve suggested that  had an elongated shape, presumably due to its rapid rotation rate of 6.71 hours, similar to Haumea and Varuna. That would give  approximate dimensions of 940×766×490 km, with its longest axis nearly twice as long as its polar axis.

Both bodies have a flat featureless spectrum in the visible and moderately strong water ice absorption bands in the near-infrared, although  has a lower albedo. Both bodies also have a weak absorption band near 2.3 μm, which may be caused by ammonia hydrate or methane ice.

Orbit and rotation 

 orbits the Sun at an average distance of 39.4 astronomical units (AU) and completes a full orbit in 247 years. It is in a 2:3 orbital resonance with Neptune;  completes two orbits around the Sun for every three orbits completed by Neptune. Since it is in a 2:3 resonance with Neptune,  is classified as a plutino. Its orbit is inclined to the ecliptic by 13.6 degrees. It had approached its aphelion (furthest distance from the Sun) in 1982 and will come to its perihelion (closest distance to the Sun) in 2107. Simulations by the Deep Ecliptic Survey show that over the next 10 million years  will not come closer (qmin) than 31.6 AU from the Sun (it will stay farther away than Neptune).

The rotation period of this minor planet was first measured by Scott Sheppard in 2003. Light curves obtained by Sheppard at the University of Hawai'i's 2.2-meter telescope gave an ambiguous rotation period of either 6.71 or 13.42 hours, with a brightness variation of 0.14 magnitudes. The shorter rotation period refers to the single-peaked solution, expected if the brightness variations resulted from albedo spots. The longer rotation period is for a double-peaked solution, more consistent with an elongated shape.

Satellite 

The object was measured with a separation of 0.22 arcsec and an apparent magnitude difference of 5.0. , attempts to recover the satellite have failed.

Notes

References

External links 
 (208996) 2003 AZ84 Precovery Images
 List Of Transneptunian Objects – Minor Planet Center
 
 

Plutinos
Discoveries by Michael E. Brown
Discoveries by Chad Trujillo
Possible dwarf planets
(208996) 2003 AZ84
Binary trans-Neptunian objects
Objects observed by stellar occultation
20030113